Armen Martirosyan may refer to:

 Armen Martirosyan (athlete) (born 1969), Armenian triple jumper
 Armen Martirosyan (Heritage), Armenian politician
 Armen Martirosyan (politician), ambassador to India for Armenia 
 Armen Martirosyan (musician) (born 1963), artistic director and conductor of the Armenian Jazz Band